DXQQ (87.5 FM), broadcasting as 87.5 Davao City Disaster Radio, is a radio station owned and operated by the City Government of Davao. Its studios are located at RJ Homes Bldg., Pelayo St., Davao City, and its transmitter is located at Brgy. Langub, Ma-a, Davao City.

The frequency was occupied by FM1 Davao until January 2020.

History
In February 2020, the City Government launched an emergency-centric community station under the identity of "Davao City Disaster Radio". Prior to the launch, the city government announced its intention to establish a community station with a purpose of disseminating vital information on disasters and emergency preparedness.

The station was officially launched on February 3, 2020 with a guest presence from Davao City Mayor Sara Duterte.

On the second quarter of 2021, the station's studios were transferred to the City Hall Annex Building, Magallanes, Davao City.

References

Radio stations in Davao City
Philippine Broadcasting Service
Radio stations established in 2020